Goyundaği adasi Island (or goyundaği adasi Island) is the largest island of the Urmia Lake in Iran. It is located in the east of that lake and covers an area of about 3,175 hectares.

Goyundaği adasi Island was declared a protected area by the Department of Environment in 1967.

Sources 
"Kaboodan Island, Urmia". 2020. Iran Travel Guide. Accessed March 6, 2020. .
Sirang Rasaneh, www.sirang.com. 2020. "Kaboodan Island (Qoyundagi) 2020 Tourist Attraction In Orumieh, Travel To Iran, Visit Iran". Itto.Org | Iran Tourism & Touring. Accessed March 6, 2020. .

Islands of Iran
Lakes of Iran